Wilders Kanal (English: Wilder Canal) is a canal which connects Christianshavns Kanal to the main harbour, opposite Søkvæsthuset, in the Christianshavn neighbourhood of Copenhagen, Denmark. It is crossed by Wilders Bro which carries Strandgade.

The canal is named after father and son, Carl and Lars Wilder, who operated a shipyard in the area just north of it, now known as Wilders Plads.

References

Canals in Copenhagen
Christianshavn